The Laurence Olivier Award for Best Actor in a Play is an annual award presented by the Society of London Theatre in recognition of achievements in commercial London theatre. The awards were established as the Society of West End Theatre Awards in 1976, and renamed in 1984 in honour of English actor and director Laurence Olivier.

This award was introduced in 1985, as Actor of the Year, then retitled to its current name for the 1993 ceremony. Prior to this award, from 1976–1984 (and again in 1988), there was a pair of awards given each year for this general category, one for Actor of the Year in a New Play and the other for Actor of the Year in a Revival.

Winners and nominees

1980s

1990s

2000s

2010s

2020s
{| class="wikitable" style="width:98%;"
|- style="background:#bebebe;"
! style="width:10%;"| Year
! style="width:25%;"| Actor
! style="width:35%;"| Play
! style="width:30%;"| Character
|-
|-
! rowspan="5" style="text-align:center;"| 2020
|-style="background:#B0C4DE"
| Andrew Scott 
| Present Laughter
| Garry Essendine
|-
| Toby Jones
| Uncle Vanya
| Uncle Vanya
|-
| James McAvoy
| Cyrano de Bergerac
| Cyrano de Bergerac
|-
| Wendell Pierce
| Death of a Salesman
| Willy Loman
|-
! align="center"| 2021
| colspan=3 align="center"| Not presented due to extended closing of theatre productions during COVID-19 pandemic
|-
! rowspan="5" |2022
|-style="background:#B0C4DE"
|Hiran Abeysekera
|Life of Pi
|Pi Patel
|-
|Ben Daniels
|The Normal Heart
|Ned Weeks
|-
|Omari Douglas
|Constellations
|Manuel
|-
|Charles Edwards
|Best of Enemies
|Gore Vidal
|-
! rowspan="6" align="center" |2023
|- 
|Tom Hollander
|Berezovsky
|Patriots
|-
|Paul Mescal
|Stanley Kowalski
|A Streetcar Named Desire
|-
|Rafe Spall
|Atticus Finch
|To Kill a Mockingbird
|-
|David Tennant
|John Halder
|Good|-
|Giles Terera
|Guy Jacobs
|Blues for an Alabama Sky|}

Multiple awards and nominations for Best Actor
Note: The below awards and nominations include individuals awarded and nominated under the now-defunct categories Actor of the Year in a New Play and Actor of the Year in a Revival as well as the current combined Best Actor category.

Awards
Four awards
Ian McKellen

Two awards
Roger Allam
Brian Cox
Alan Howard
Derek Jacobi
Mark Rylance
Antony Sher

Nominations
Eleven nominations
Michael Gambon

Ten nominations
Ian McKellen

Seven nominations
Derek Jacobi
Mark Rylance
David Suchet

Five nominations
Simon Russell Beale

Four nominations
Roger Allam
James McAvoy
Antony Sher

Three nominations

Two nominations

Multiple awards and nominations for a character
Awards
Two awards
Falstaff from Henry IV, Parts 1 and 2Richard III of England from Richard IIIWilly Loman from Death of a SalesmanEddie Carbone from A View from the BridgeNominations
Six nominations
Prince Hamlet from HamletFour nominations
King Lear from King LearUncle Vanya from Uncle VanyaThree nominations
Coriolanus from CoriolanusEddie Carbone from A View from the BridgeFalstaff from Henry IV, Parts 1 and 2Henry V of England from Henry VIago from OthelloLeontes from The Winter's TaleShylock from The Merchant of VeniceSpooner from No Man's LandWilly Loman from Death of a SalesmanTwo nominations
Captain Shotover from Heartbreak HouseDavies from The CaretakerGeorge III from The Madness of George IIIJohn Procter from The CrucibleMacbeth from MacbethMax from The HomecomingNed Weeks from The Normal HeartOlivia from Twelfth NightRichard III of England from Richard III''

See also
 Laurence Olivier Award for Actor of the Year in a New Play (1976–1984, 1988)
 Laurence Olivier Award for Actor of the Year in a Revival (1976–1984, 1988)
 Critics' Circle Theatre Award for Best Actor
 Evening Standard Theatre Award for Best Actor
 Tony Award for Best Actor in a Play

References

External links
 

Actor
Theatre acting awards